Lianne McLellan Nelson-Bennion  (born June 15, 1972 in Houston, Texas) is an American rower who attended Lakeside High School in Seattle and Princeton University.

References 

 
 

1972 births
Living people
American female rowers
People from Houston
Rowers at the 2000 Summer Olympics
Rowers at the 2004 Summer Olympics
Olympic silver medalists for the United States in rowing
World Rowing Championships medalists for the United States
Medalists at the 2004 Summer Olympics
21st-century American women